Sheikh Saad or variants may refer to:

 Al-Shaykh Saad, a town in Daraa Governorate, Syria
 Al-Shaykh Saad, Tartus Governorate, Syria
 ash-Sheikh Sa'd, a Palestinian village in the Jerusalem Governorate
 Sheykh Saad, a village in Shush County, Khuzestan Province, Iran
 Battle of Sheikh Sa'ad, in Mesopotamia, 1916
 Saad Al-Salim Al-Sabah, Emir of Kuwait (15–24 January 2006)

See also
 Sheikh Said